Nith  may refer to:

River Nith (Scotland)
Nith River (Canada)
Nīþ a term for a social stigma implying the loss of honour and the status of a villain.
Nithing pole
National Institute of Technology, Hamirpur
Norwegian School of Information Technology